USHR or Ushr may refer to:

United States House of Representatives, one of the two houses of the United States Congress. 
Ushr, an Islamic tax on trade and agriculture

See also 
 Usher (disambiguation)